Dyslexia Action (formerly the Dyslexia Institute) founded in 1972 is an organization, based in Staines, Surrey, England, with three main divisions:

Dyslexia Action Training
Dyslexia Guild
Dyslexia Action Shop

Dyslexia Training offers online training at various levels to help education professionals deal with Dyslexia and Co-occurring difficulties that may occur. The developmental training offers a number of services for those who are already trained or interested in becoming SpLD specialist teachers and assessors.

The Guild is an open membership group with members working and learning in a wide range of settings. The Guild welcomes all professionals with an interest in dyslexia/SpLD and has a special rate for organizations.

The Dyslexia Shop is an online resource offering educators and parents tools to support creating the best possible outcomes for those with dyslexia and co-occurring challenges that may come along with the disorder.

History

Dyslexia Institute was founded in 1972 by Wendy Fisher when the Word Blind Society was shut down. The Word Blind Society was the first established clinic, in Britain, that catered to children diagnosed with dyslexia. The clinic also had the intent to provide evidence that may be used to claim the validity of the condition as a disorder. After the closing of the clinic ( due to the lack of funds), we won't see another establishment dedicated to people with dyslexia in the UK (like the Word Blind Society) until Kathleen Hickey, who became the Director of Studies, and "The Hickey Program"  (which is a course written and directed by Hickey, that focuses on ways in which teachers can teach people with dyslexia in the UK, it is used by many teachers and instructors who care for or teach people with dyslexia. The text also includes games, lesson plans, and activities for learners) this program lies at the heart of the teacher training qualification programs for over a decade in the UK. In 2005 the Dyslexia Institute merged with Hornsby International Dyslexia Centre, and was renamed Dyslexia Action in March 2006.

Under its previous title, Dyslexia Action had been providing teaching and support for dyslexic children, young people, and adults, as well as specialist training for teachers, since 1972. It was initially founded as the Dyslexia Institute by Kathleen Hickey and Wendy Fisher, as a progression from the Surrey Dyslexia Institute, which had been in existence since 1968.

By 1981, the Institute had acquired 12 centers nationwide, and in 1993, the Institute began to offer its own Postgraduate Diploma course validated by Kingston University, and later York University and currently Middlesex University. In February 2003 Sophie, Countess of Wessex, agreed to become the organization's Patron. In July 2003 the Countess opened the institute's Head Office at Park House in Egham, Surrey.  Head Office moved to 10 High Street Egham in May 2014 and the Countess officially opened the Egham Learning Centre during Dyslexia Awareness Week on 4 November 2014.

On Thursday 13 April 2017 Matthew Haw and Karen Spears of RSM Restructuring Advisory LLP were appointed as administrators of Dyslexia Institute Limited t/a Dyslexia Action. Following negotiations, the Training division, Shop, and Guild were purchased by Real Group Ltd and continue to trade.

To celebrate the 50th Anniversary of Dyslexia Action, the Kathleen Hickey Teaching Scholarship was launched in 2022. The Scholarship was created for those with a passion to become a specialist teacher by studying the Level 5 Diploma in Specialist Teaching for Literacy-related Difficulties (DIST) but who may not have the financial means to do so. This very much celebrates the ethos of Kathleen Hickey who assumed almost all children were educable and treated them as such. She found an approach that enabled some children with cerebral palsy to read and write - children who had been thought incapable of gaining literacy skills by other education professionals in the 1950s.

Current services

Dyslexia Action Training offers courses to qualify specialist teachers and specialist assessors, along with online CPD courses aimed at educators.

There is an online shop that provides specialist products to support those with dyslexia and literacy difficulties.

The Dyslexia Guild, established in 1994, is a professional membership body for those who are specialist teachers, assessors, or who offer support to people with dyslexia. It continues to offer many benefits to members, including a specialist library service, and holds an annual Summer Conference. The Dyslexia Guild celebrated the 25th anniversary in 2019 as well as the 50th anniversary of the Dyslexia Review.

Objectives

The organization exists to support and train teachers and educators in helping those with dyslexia and other specific learning difficulties reach their potential. It also has a membership body - the Guild - created to act as a voice of its membership and to represent the sector.

Further reading

References

External links 
 Dyslexia Action website

 Educational charities based in the United Kingdom
Dyslexia